General Directorate of Gendarmerie (GDG) or Darak forces is a public security agency of the Hashemite Kingdom of Jordan, which lies under the jurisdiction of the country's Ministry of Interior. The Directorate was formed by a Royal decree in 2008, and is tasked with maintaining security and order in the country.

History
In 1946, the Gendarmerie was integrated into the police. In 2008, the GDG was established from units from the Public Security Directorate including the Special Security Forces (SSF) and Air Unit.

References

Law enforcement in Jordan
Jordan